Nosov (from нос meaning nose) is a Russian masculine surname, its feminine counterpart is Nosova. Notable people with the surname include:

Aleksandr Nosov (born 1995), Russian football forward 
Maksim Nosov (born 1976), Russian football player
Nikolay Nosov (1908–1976), Soviet children's literature writer
Tamara Nosova (1927–2007), Russian actress
Victor Nosov (disambiguation) 
Viktor Nosov (pilot) (1923–1945), Soviet World War II hero 
Viktor Nosov (footballer), Soviet footballer and coach from Ukraine
Vitaly Nosov (born 1968), Russian basketball player
Yevgeni Nosov (writer) (1925–2002), Russian writer
Yuliya Pechonkina (born Nosova in 1978), Russian sprinter

Russian-language surnames